Charytín Goyco (born María del Rosario Goico Rodríguez, on May 23, 1949 in Santa Lucía), better known in show business as simply Charytín, is a Dominican singer, television hostess and actress.

Early life
Born in Santa Lucía, El Seibo, to a Dominican father (of Russian, Serbian, Montenegrin, French and Spanish ancestry), and a Spaniard mother (her mother was an attorney from Asturias, Spain who found herself exiled during the regime of Francisco Franco). At an early age, her mother took her and her sister to Spain after breaking up with her father. She returned to the Dominican Republic after nearly ten years of living abroad, when her parents reconciled.

Career
Charytín moved to Puerto Rico in the 1970s. She met her husband, television actor and producer Elín Ortiz in Dominican Republic and he became her manager. He was recently divorced from Puerto Rican vedette Iris Chacón. Later Charytín and Ortiz started a relationship and married in 1974. During the 1970s, she began a weekly TV show on WAPA-TV, which aired every Sunday night until 1985.

Charytín became an international superstar with her song Mosquita Muerta, named after a character she played on a comedy section of her show, becoming a chart topper in places like Mexico, Venezuela, and Argentina.

In 1974 she represented her country, the Dominican Republic in the third edition of the OTI Festival which was held in Acapulco, México, in which she achieved for her country the fifth place with seven points. In 1979, she and Elín had their first son, Shalim, who is now a singer and actor who has appeared on Lizzie McGuire and Heroes.

In 1983, Charytín made a movie in Spanish named Prohibido Amar en Nueva York with Mexican actor Julio Alemán. (Forbidden To Love in New York). Two of the songs on that movie's soundtrack, Tu Vida Es Un Suspenso Hasta El Final & Para Llegar, became another chart toppers for Charytín. In 1986, she and Iris Chacón acted together, alongside Dominican-Mexican actor Andrés García and Puerto Rican best selling singer, Yolandita Monge, on a soap opera named Escandalo. This telenovela did not enjoy much success and was cut by half by the producers. In 1988, she moved to Miami with Elin and Shalim, and in late 1989, she became pregnant again, giving birth in 1990 to twins, a boy (Alexander) and a girl (Sharinna) born at Pavia Hospital in San Juan Puerto Rico.

During the early 1990s, she dedicated herself to raise her twins, taking them along on the few tours she did and her several trips to Puerto Rico. Late in the 1990s, she returned to television, hosting a show for a television shopping network. Additionally, she worked on commercials promoting Palmolive dish washing products for several years, most of which featured her twins.

In 2002 she began hosting a celebrity gossip show, Escándalo TV along Marisa del Portillo, Felipe Viel and Lilia Luciano for TeleFutura.

On April 19, 2003, Charytín won the Asociación de Cronistas de Espectáculos de Nueva York's Premio Extraordinario ACE por Distinción y Mérito (ACE Extraordinary Award for Distinction and Merit) at its 35th Annual ACE Awards presentation.

She used to host a daily entertainment news show for Univisión Sister Station TeleFutura. This was a 2-hour gossip/entertainment show Escándalo TV (formerly "Escándalo en el Medio Dia", but later changed due to a similarly named program airing in Mexico by Televisa S.A.) In 2007, the Art Critics Association of the Dominican Republic recognized her work with a Lifetime Achievement Award.
Later on, she had a new TV show ,"CHARYTÍN", on Mega TV from Monday to Friday.

Discography

Albums
 Charytín (1974)
 Bailemos El Bimbo (1975)
 Alexandra (1975)
 La Compositora (1976)
 La Dulce Charytín (1977)
 Mosquita Muerta (1978)
 Calor (1979)
 Charytín (1980)
 La Sencillez (1981)
 Canciones de la pelicula Prohibido Amar en Nueva York (1982)
 Se Acabo... (1983)
 Guitarras y Violines (1984)
 Verdades Desnudas (1985)
 De Regreso Al Pasado (1987)
 Por Ese Hombre... (1988)
 Sutil (1992)
 Recuerdos (1995)
 7 Vidas (2014)

See also
 List of television presenters
 List of people from the Dominican Republic

Notes

References

External links
 
 Photos

1954 births
Living people
Dominican Republic people of Spanish descent
People from El Seibo Province
Dominican Republic film actresses
Dominican Republic telenovela actresses
Dominican Republic television actresses
20th-century Dominican Republic women singers
Dominican Republic television talk show hosts
Dominican Republic emigrants to Puerto Rico
Dominican Republic people of Serbian descent
Women in Latin music
White Dominicans